
Year 68 BC was a year of the pre-Julian Roman calendar. At the time it was known as the Year of the Consulship of Metellus/Vatia and Rex (or, less frequently, year 686 Ab urbe condita). The denomination 68 BC for this year has been used since the early medieval period, when the Anno Domini calendar era became the prevalent method in Europe for naming years.

Events 
 By place 

 Roman Republic 
 Consuls: Lucius Caecilius Metellus and Quintus Marcius Rex.
 October 6 – Lucius Lucullus defeats Tigranes II of Armenia in the Battle of Artaxata.
 Gaius Antonius Hybrida elected praetor.
 Tribune of the plebs Gaius Antius Restio passes the Lex Antia sumptuaria law forbidding Roman magistrates from attending banquets.
 Ostia, the harbour city of Ancient Rome, is sacked by pirates. The port is set on fire and the consular war fleet is destroyed.

 Osroene 
 Abgar II becomes ruler of Osroene.

Births 
 Arsinoe IV of Egypt, daughter of Ptolemy XII (and probably Cleopatra V) (d. 41 BC)

Deaths 
 Antiochus of Ascalon, Greek philosopher (b. c. 130 BC)
 Cornelia, wife of Julius Caesar (b. 94 BC)
 Huo Guang, official of the western Han Dynasty
 Lucius Caecillius Metellus, Roman consul

References